Elachista glaserella is a moth of the family Elachistidae that is found in Portugal, Spain and France.

References

glaserella
Moths described in 2000
Moths of Europe